Huell Burnley Howser (October 18, 1945 – January 7, 2013) was an American television personality, actor, producer, writer, singer, and voice artist, best known for hosting, producing, and writing California's Gold and his human interest show Visiting... with Huell Howser, produced by KCET in Los Angeles for California PBS stations. The archive of his video chronicles offers an enhanced understanding of the history, culture, and people of California. He also voiced the Backson in Winnie the Pooh (2011).

Early life
Howser was born in Gallatin, Tennessee, on October 18, 1945, to Harold Chamberlain and Jewell Havens (Burnley) Howser. Howser's first name is a portmanteau of his parents' given names, Harold and Jewell, as Howser explained in the California's Gold episode "Smartsville."

Howser graduated from the University School of Nashville in 1963, then studied history and political science at the University of Tennessee, where he served as student body president.

Career
After serving in the U.S. Marine Corps Reserve and on the staff of U.S. Senator Howard Baker, Howser began his television career at WSMV-TV in Nashville, Tennessee, where he produced shows focused on human interest stories, such as Happy Features and The Happy World of Huell Howser. Howser was also a television personality working for the University of Tennessee.

After working in New York City as the host of WCBS-TV's "Real Life" show, Howser moved to Los Angeles, California, in 1981 to work as a reporter for KCBS-TV. During 1982 and 1983, he served as weekend host and correspondent for Entertainment Tonight. In 1983, he joined KCET (then a PBS affiliate) as host and producer of Videolog, a series of brief human-interest segments running less than 10 minutes each, that aired in between the station's shorter programs to fill up air time. "Videolog" eventually became one of the more popular programs on KCET, and in 1990, the show was expanded to half hour-long episodes. Included in Videolog was lint artist Slater Barron among other topics relevant to Los Angeles and adjacent communities.

California's Gold

In 1991, after spending his vacation driving across the Golden State and visiting with all 13 PBS stations in California, California's Gold premiered in April of that year. California's Gold highlights small towns, landmarks, events, or places of interest throughout California that are not well known to the general public. Howser conducted informal, often impromptu, interviews with locals involved with the sites he visited. He also produced California's Communities, California's Golden Fairs, Downtown, California's Water, California's Green, California's Golden Coast, California's Golden Parks, Road Trip, Visiting... with Huell Howser, California Missions, Palm Springs, Our Neighborhoods, The Bench, and various specials.

Visiting... with Huell Howser

Visiting... with Huell Howser was a weekly PBS series hosted by Howser that originally aired from 1991 until his retirement in 2012 that focused on "the diverse people, places, and events that make southern California such a unique community." , KCET, and other Southern California PBS continue to rerun this popular series. Episodes can be viewed on demand on the Chapman University, and PBS affiliates' websites.

Other work

Articles written by Howser appeared in Westways, the magazine of the Automobile Club of Southern California.

In 1997, he featured prominently as himself alongside Tracey Ullman in character as Ruby Romaine in the Tracey Takes On... episode "Hollywood."

Howser spearheaded an unsuccessful effort to stop the demolition of buildings designed by Paul Williams at the Long Beach Naval Shipyard.

He appeared in Who Killed the Electric Car? (2006) in his capacity as a reporter, witnessing the demolition and shredding of a Honda EV Plus.

In 2011, Howser voiced the Backson in the post-credits scene of Walt Disney Animation Studios' feature film Winnie the Pooh.

Personal life
Howser lived in the historic El Royale apartments in Los Angeles, California, in an apartment which had previously been home to character actor William Frawley. Howser also had homes in Palm Springs and Twentynine Palms.

On June 29, 2015, Howser's Twentynine Palms home became available for rentals and weddings.

Howser mentioned that he was a Methodist during his episode covering the Nevada County Fair on California's Golden Fairs.

Volcano House
In 2010, Howser put the unusual residence on the market for $650,000.

In June 2012, The Panther, a student-run newspaper for Chapman University, announced that Howser had donated the Volcano House to the school. On September 3, 2015, Chapman University sold the Volcano House for $750,000.

Retirement and death
On November 27, 2012, The Sacramento Bee reported that Howser was retiring from making new shows, amid speculation in the television community that he was seriously ill.

On January 7, 2013, Howser died at his Palm Springs home, at the age of 67. He had been battling cancer for several years and his death certificate listed metastatic prostate cancer as the cause. Howser's body was cremated and his ashes were scattered at sea off the coast of Los Angeles County.

On January 15, 2013, a memorial was held for Howser, who said before his death that he did not want a funeral as he did not want attention.

Legacy

Howser donated his videotaped collection of California's Gold episodes, as well as those of his other series, to Chapman University in 2011. He also donated his personal papers, and a large collection of books on California history to the university. The school established the Huell Howser Archives, which, when completed, will offer the public free access to the entire digitized collection of his life's work. The archives can be accessed at Chapman University as well as on the internet. He also gave his extensive art collection, which consists mostly of "found-object" art collected during his travels, to the university, and endowed the California's Gold Scholarship Fund. Upon his death he bequeathed his remaining two homes to the university, the proceeds from the sale of which will be added to the scholarship fund.

Testimonials to Howser's unique contribution to the celebration of California history and culture were acknowledged in numerous media sources upon word of his death. Gustavo Arellano, then-editor of the OC Weekly, called Howser "the greatest Californian since Hiram Johnson," noting that for Howser, "California was the ultimate temple of the American dream." Such an assessment reflects the high regard in which many Californians hold Howser's achievement of a very media savvy and unabashedly enthusiastic promotion of their state's heritage.

In 2015, a Golden Palm Star on the Palm Springs, California, Walk of Stars was dedicated to him.

In popular culture
Howser's enthusiastic style as host of his various travel shows led to him being impersonated and lampooned by comedians and radio personalities, such as Adam Carolla, Dana Gould, Ralph Garman, and James Adomian.

Matt Groening has stated he is a fan of Howser and featured him in two episodes of The Simpsons: "There's Something About Marrying," in which a character named Howell Huser (voiced by Dan Castellaneta) falls off a turnip truck, and "O Brother, Where Bart Thou?," in which the real Howser presents a program similar to Marc Summers' Unwrapped television program titled Under the Wrapper. Howser received a voice credit for the episode. The Simpsons episode "A Test Before Trying" commemorated his death with a quick cartoon memorial shot at the end of the episode, stating: "In Memory of Huell Howser, Friend of the Simpsons and a friend of California."

Filmography

References

Further reading

External links 

 Huell Howser Archives at Chapman University
 Visiting with Huell Howser, from KCET
 
 Interactive map of places Huell visited
 Huell Howser – California's Dreamer, from the KVIE website
 Lunch With Huell Q&A with Huell Howser by Aaron Proctor in the Pasadena Weekly August 20, 2008.
 
 In Memory of Huell Howser

1945 births
2013 deaths
American male voice actors
American male film actors
American male television actors
Television personalities from California
Male actors from Tennessee
People from Gallatin, Tennessee
Male actors from Palm Springs, California
Travel broadcasters
United States Marines
University of Tennessee alumni
American Methodists
Deaths from cancer in California
Deaths from prostate cancer
California culture